Hypothesis Theory is a psychological theory of learning developed during the 1960s and 1970s.

Experimental Framework 

In the basic experimental framework, the subject is presented with a series of multidimensional stimuli and provided feedback about the class of the stimulus on each trial.  (Two class problems are typical.)  The framework is thus in many ways similar to that of concept learning.

In contrast to earlier association-type theories, the Hypothesis Theory argues that subjects solve this problem (i.e., learn the correct response to each stimulus), by testing a series of hypotheses about the relation of the cue values (stimulus features) to the class.  For example, a candidate hypothesis for stimuli that vary along the three dimensions of shape, colour, and size might be

Because the subject is proposed to learn through the successive testing of hypotheses, the rate of learning should be highly dependent on the order in which hypotheses are tested, and on the particular hypotheses which are available to the learner.  (It is conceivable that a given learner may not be able to formulate the hypothesis that would correctly classify the stimuli.)  It is argued that as a result of the feature, Hypothesis theory can account for instances of poor learning that occur in some cases even when the statistical associational strength is high.

Formal Theories 

The process by which a subject is proposed to go about forming such rules or hypothesis has been the topic of formal probabilistic modeling, a discussion of which can be found in the references. A conceptual framework for formal probabilistic modeling of hypotheses in cognitive research has been given by Rudolf Groner

Status of Research

Hypothesis theory has fallen out of favor (along with many other rule-based models) in the wake of prototype and exemplar theories, both of which employ a notion of graded similarity rather than crisp set membership.

See also 

For issues of knowledge (i.e., class) representability:
Rough sets
Probably approximately correct learning  (PAC learning)
 Bold hypothesis

References 

 

Learning theory (education)